Heungkuk Life Insurance Co, Ltd.(established 1950) is a South Korean insurance company headquartered in Seoul, South Korea.

Information
It is a part of Taekwang Group, Korea's 40th largest chaebol. The life insurance division of the company controls a large portion of the South Korean calling card market.

See also
Incheon Heungkuk Life Pink Spiders
Economy of South Korea

References

External links
Heungkuk Life Homepage 

South Korean companies established in 1950
Companies based in Seoul
Financial services companies established in 1950
Insurance companies of South Korea
Taekwang Group
Life insurance companies